In Mandaeism, the dukrana or dukrania is a type of memorial ritual meal commemorating the dead.

It is distinct from the zidqa brika and lofani, which are two other types of ritual meal offered for the dead.

See also
Sacred food as offering
Eucharist
Koliva
Lofani
Laufa
Zidqa brika

References

Mandaean ceremonial food and drink
Mandaic words and phrases
Funeral food and drink